This is a timeline documenting events of Jazz in the year 1945.

Events
 Miles Davis  has graduated from high school. He goes to New York and becomes a musician. He enrolls in Juilliard at his parents' request.
 John Coltrane was drafted and plays clarinet with the Navy Band in Hawaii.

Standards

Album releases 
Mary Lou Williams: Zodiac Suite (1945)
John Serry Sr.: Leone Jump for Sonora Records (catalogue # 3001 B) with the Biviano Accordion & Rhythm Sextette

Deaths

 March
 10 – Josef Taussig, Czech trombonist and journalist (born 1914).

 April
 25 – Teddy Weatherford, American pianist, an accomplished stride pianist (born 1903).

 August
 5 – Nat Jaffe, American pianist (born 1918).

 October
 7 – Erhard Bauschke, German reedist and bandleader (born 1912).
 14 – Pha Terrell, American singer (born 1910).

 December
 8 – Richard M. Jones, American pianist, composer, band leader, and record producer (born 1892).
 16 – Jack Jenney, American trombonist (born 1910).
 29 – Bobby Stark, American trumpeter (born 1906).

Births

 January
 2 – Terje Bjørklund, Norwegian pianist and composer.
 15 – Bob Maize, American upright bassist (died 2004).
 27 – Henri Texier, French upright bassist.

 February
 3 – Bob Stewart, American tubist.
 4 – John Stubblefield, American saxophonist, flautist, and oboist (died 2005).
 6 – Ernie Krivda, American saxophonist.
 13 – Keith Nichols, English multi-instrumentalist.
 15 – Edward Vesala, Finnish drummer (died 1999).
 16 – Pete Christlieb, American tenor saxophonist.
 21 – Akira Sakata, Japanese saxophonist.
 24
 Kaj Backlund, Finnish trumpeter, composer, arranger, and bandleader (died 2013).
 Steve Berrios, American drummer and percussionist (died 2013).

 March
 17 – Elis Regina, Brazilian singer (died 1982).
 21 – Ed Soph, American drummer and educator.
 23 – David Grisman, American mandolinist.

 April
 1 – Bjørnar Andresen, Norwegian bassist (died 2004).
 4 – Leszek Żądło, Polish saxophonist, flautist, composer, and university teacher.
 9 – Steve Gadd, American drummer.
 12 – Doug Riley, Canadian pianist (died 2007).
 19 – Ole Kock Hansen, Danish pianist and composer.
 22 – Demetrio Stratos, Greek lyricist and multi-instrumentalist (died 1979).
 25 – Halvard Kausland, Norwegian guitarist (died 2017).
 27 – Dominic Duval, American bassist (died 2016).
 29 – Hugh Hopper, British bass guitarist (died 2009).

 May
 2 – Bob Rockwell, American saxophonist.
 4 – Bill Stapleton, American trumpeter and arranger (died 1984).
 8 – Keith Jarrett, American pianist and composer.
 13 – Lou Marini, American saxophonist, arranger and composer.
 16 – Michael Moore, American bassist.
 24 – Terry Callier, American guitarist and singer-songwriter (died 2012).

 June
 3 – Bjørn Alterhaug, Norwegian bassist, arranger, and composer.
 4 – Anthony Braxton, American composer, saxophonist, clarinettist, flautist, and pianist.
 6 – Tom Coppola, American pianist and arranger.
 9 – Mick Goodrick, American guitarist.
 28 – Magni Wentzel, Norwegian singer and guitarist.

 July
 3 – Thomas Mapfumo, Zimbabwean singer.
 11 – Vaughn Wiester, American musician and educator.
 12 – Bernard Lubat, French drummer, pianist, singer, percussionist, vibraphonist, and accordionist.
 13 – Josef Vejvoda, Czech composer, percussionist, conductor and bandleader.
 29 – Joe Beck, American guitarist (died 2008).
 30 – David Sanborn, American alto saxophonist.

 August
 14 – Eliana Pittman, Brazilian singer.
 19 – Brian Godding, American guitarist.
 21 – Takehiro Honda, Japanese pianist (died 2006).
 22 – Sylvia Vrethammar, Swedish singer.
 24 – Bryan Spring or Brian Spring, British drummer.
 28 – Victor Assis Brasil, Brazilian saxophonist (died 1981).
 29 – Trevor Richards, English drummer.

 September
 2 – Svein Finnerud, Norwegian pianist (died 2000).
 4 – Danny Gatton, American guitarist (died 1994).
 10 – Harry Pepl, Austrian guitarist (died 2005).
 27 – Peter Ecklund, American cornetist.
 28 – Murray Wall, Australian upright bassist.

 October
 5
 Geoff Leigh, English saxophonist and flautist.
 George Finola, American cornetist (died 2000).
 8 – John Betsch, American drummer.
 14 – Colin Hodgkinson, British bass guitarist.
 19 – Carol Kidd, Scottish singer.
 23 – Ernie Watts, American saxophonist.
 27 – Arild Andersen, Norwegian upright bassist.
 28 – Elton Dean, English saxophonist (died 2006).

 November
 3 – Mark Kramer, American pianist and composer.
 10 – John LaBarbera, American trumpeter and arranger.
 13 – Knut Riisnæs, Norwegian saxophonist.
 26 – Jim Mullen, Scottish guitarist.
 27 – Randy Brecker, American trumpeter and flugelhorn player, Brecker Brothers.
 30 – Johnny Dyani, South African upright bassist and pianist (died 1986).

 December
 12 – Tony Williams, American drummer (died 1997).
 15 – Kimiko Kasai, Japanese singer.
 21 – Cameron Brown, American upright bassist.
 28 – Daniel Carter, American saxophonist, flautist, clarinetist, and trumpeter.

 Unknown date
 Johnny "Dandy" Rodriguez Jr, American percussionist.
 Mongezi Feza, South African trumpeter and flautist (died 1975).
 Steve Gregory, English saxophonist, flautist, and composer.

See also
 1940s in jazz
 List of years in jazz
 1945 in music

References

Bibliography

External links 
 History Of Jazz Timeline: 1945 at All About Jazz

Jazz
Jazz by year